The Godzilla head is a landmark and tourist attraction in Kabukichō, Shinjuku, Tokyo, Japan. The sculpture is accessible from Hotel Gracery Shinjuku's Godzilla Terrace, on the Shinjuku Toho Building. It depicts Godzilla, occasionally with "glowing eyes and smoky breath". The 80-ton head, based on Godzilla's appearance in Godzilla vs. Mothra (1992), was unveiled in 2015. Its placement on the Hotel Gracery's terrace matches Godzilla's 50 meter height seen during the Showa era films in the franchise.

Reception
Editors of Time Out Tokyo included the Godzilla head in their 2019 list of the city's "best public art sculptures".

See also
 Godzilla in popular culture
 Godzilla Street

References

2015 establishments in Japan
2015 sculptures
Godzilla (franchise)
Outdoor sculptures in Tokyo
Shinjuku
Tourist attractions in Tokyo
Heads in the arts